Francis Cotton (5 May 1857 – 28 November 1942) also known as Frank Cotton, was an Australian politician.

Born in Adelaide to grocer Richard Cotton and Esther Ann Payne, he was educated privately and worked on a cattle station in Port Lincoln before arriving in New South Wales in 1875. He married Evangeline Mary Geake Lake on 1 January 1883 at Forbes; they had six children. After working as a shearer, farmer and drover, he moved to Sydney to become a journalist in 1889 and was editor of the Democrat, a single tax paper, in 1891; he had founded the Forbes tax reform group in 1887 and joined the Single Tax League in 1889. In 1890 he represented Wagga Wagga on the Trades and Labor Council, and in 1891 he was elected to the New South Wales Legislative Assembly as the Labor member for Newtown, serving until 1894.

On 8 June 1891, he supported the formation of the Womanhood Suffrage League of New South Wales, saying that "equality was the soul of equity." In April 1892 he chaired a debate between Eliza Ashton and Rose Scott on Ashton's controversial views on marriage laws.

From 1895 to 1901 he was member for Newtown-Camperdown, this time for the Free Trade Party. Cotton died in Sydney in 1942.

References

1857 births
1942 deaths
Free Trade Party politicians
Members of the New South Wales Legislative Assembly
Politicians from Adelaide
Politicians from Sydney
Australian farmers
Australian journalists
Australian Labor Party members of the Parliament of New South Wales